Tom York may refer to:
 Tom York (television personality) (1924–2021), American television personality
 Tom York (baseball) (1850–1936), American baseball left fielder
 Tom York (actor), English actor

See also 
 Thom Yorke (born 1968), English musician and lead singer of Radiohead
 Tom Yorke (1920–2004), rugby league footballer
 Thomas Yorke (disambiguation)